The 2012 Asian Karate Championships are the 11th edition of the Senior Asian Karate Championships and 12th edition of the Cadet, Junior & U21 Asian Karate Championships and were held in Tashkent, Uzbekistan from July 14 to July 17, 2012.

Medalists

Men

Women

Medal table

References
 Results

External links
 akf-karatedo.com

Asian Championships
Asian Karate Championships
Asian Karate Championships
Karate Championships
Asian Karate Championships
Sport in Tashkent